A planetarium is a theatre built primarily for presenting educational and entertaining shows about astronomy and the night sky.

Planetarium may also refer to:

Science
 Astrarium, also called a planetarium, a type of astronomical clock
 Orrery, a mechanical model of the Solar System
 Planetarium (Belgium), the planetarium of the Royal Observatory of Belgium, in Brussels
 Planetarium (Copenhagen)

Music
 Planetarium (album), a 2017 album by Sufjan Stevens, Bryce Dessner, Nico Muhly, and James McAlister
 "Planetarium" (Ai Otsuka song), 2005
 "Planetarium" (Bump of Chicken song), 2005
 "Planetarium", a song by Squarepusher from Hello Everything

Other uses
 Planetarium (film), a 2016 French-Belgian film
 Planetarium (board game), a 2017 strategy game
 Planetarium (UTA station), a transit station in Salt Lake City, Utah, US